The Bryansk Oblast Duma is the regional parliament of Bryansk Oblast, a federal subject of Russia. A total of 60 deputies are elected for five-year terms.

Elections

2019

References

Bryansk Oblast
Politics of Bryansk Oblast